Arild Dahl (7 October 1902 – 28 March 1984) was a Norwegian sport wrestler.

He was born in Trondheim, and represented the club Narvik Atletklubb. He competed at the 1936 Summer Olympics, where he placed sixth in Greco-Roman wrestling, the lightweight class. He also competed at the 1932 Olympics. He won bronze medals at the 1931 and 1933 European championships. He was Norwegian champion ten times.

References

External links
 

1902 births
1984 deaths
Sportspeople from Trondheim
Olympic wrestlers of Norway
Wrestlers at the 1932 Summer Olympics
Wrestlers at the 1936 Summer Olympics
Norwegian male sport wrestlers
20th-century Norwegian people